Aššur-uballiṭ or Ashur-uballit was one of two Assyrian kings:

 Ashur-uballit I or Aššur-uballiṭ I, reigned between 1365 and 1330 BC, was the first king of the Middle Assyrian Empire 
 Ashur-uballit II or Aššur-uballiṭ II, last king of the Neo-Assyrian Empire, succeeding Sin-shar-ishkun (623–612 BC)